Toni Müller (born 10 May 1984) is a curler from Baden, Switzerland. He currently throws fourth stones for Thomas Lips.

He is mostly known for serving as the Alternate for Ralph Stöckli's team which finished fourth at the 2009 Moncton World Championships, won a silver at the 2009 Aberdeen European Championships and a bronze medal for Team Switzerland at the 2010 Vancouver Olympic Games.

Müller won gold medals at the 2008 and the 2009 World Mixed Doubles Curling Championships with his partner Irene Schori. However, they finished seventh at the 2010 World Mixed Doubles Curling Championship after being beaten by the Chinese team of Sun Yue and Zhang Zhipeng in an extra end in the quarterfinals. In an interview post-match, Schori stated that she and Müller would consider not attending next year to give a chance to other Swiss teams to compete.

Müller throws right-handed.

Teammates

2009 Moncton World Championships

2009 Aberdeen European Championships

2010 Vancouver Olympic Games

Ralph Stöckli, Skip

Jan Hauser, Third

Markus Eggler, Second*

Simon Strübin, Lead

Note: In several competitions Markus Eggler has skipped the game as a Second with Ralph Stöckli throwing fourth stones.

References

1. https://web.archive.org/web/20110717141622/http://www.worldcurlingtour.com/teams.php?teamid=43839

External links

Swiss male curlers
Living people
Curlers at the 2010 Winter Olympics
Olympic curlers of Switzerland
Olympic bronze medalists for Switzerland
1984 births
People from Baden, Switzerland
Olympic medalists in curling
Medalists at the 2010 Winter Olympics
World mixed doubles curling champions
Sportspeople from Aargau
21st-century Swiss people